Nunda Township may refer to:

 Nunda Township, McHenry County, Illinois
 Nunda Township, Michigan
 Nunda Township, Freeborn County, Minnesota
 Nunda Township, Lake County, South Dakota, in Lake County, South Dakota

Township name disambiguation pages